Robert B. Priddy (born March 24, 1930) is an American former professional basketball player. Priddy was selected in the 1952 NBA draft by the Baltimore Bullets after a collegiate career at New Mexico A&M. He played for the Bullets in just 16 games during the 1952–53 season.

References

1930 births
Living people
American men's basketball players
Baltimore Bullets (1944–1954) draft picks
Baltimore Bullets (1944–1954) players
Basketball players from Oklahoma
New Mexico State Aggies men's basketball players
People from Altus, Oklahoma
Small forwards
Wilkes-Barre Barons players